Hamad Al-Hammadi (born 26 November 1975) is a Qatari table tennis player. He competed in the 1996 and 2000 Summer Olympics.

References

1975 births
Living people
Table tennis players at the 1996 Summer Olympics
Table tennis players at the 2000 Summer Olympics
Qatari male table tennis players
Olympic table tennis players of Qatar
Table tennis players at the 2002 Asian Games
Table tennis players at the 2006 Asian Games
Asian Games competitors for Qatar